CERC or Cerc may refer to:

Places
 Cers, Hérault, France (Occitan: Cèrç)
 Cerc, a village in Valea Ierii, Transylvania, Romania
 Cerc, a village in Oltrona di San Mamette, Lombardy, Italy

Other uses
 Central Electricity Regulatory Commission, a key regulator of power sector in India
 CERC, the proteins Cab-45, reticulocalbin, Erc-55 (RCN2), and calumenin
 Center for Environmental Research and Conservation, now Earth Institute Center for Environmental Sustainability
 Consumer Education and Research Center in India, a consumer movement organisation
 California Energy Research Center, at California State University, Bakersfield

See also
 Cercs, a municipality in Berguedà, Catalonia
 Rislenemdaz, developmental code name CERC-301, a drug for treatment-resistant depression
 Aticaprant, developmental codes CERC-501, a drug for the treatment of major depressive disorder